Lee County School District (LCSD) is a school district headquartered in Beattyville, Kentucky. It serves residents in Lee County.

 the district has about 1,100 students.

History

By 2016 the school district enrollment declined due to the county losing population; this stemmed from area job losses.

Schools and facilities
Schools:
Lee County High School (Beattyville)
Lee County Middle School (Beattyville)
Lee County Elementary School (Unincorporated area)

Facilities:
Lee County Area Technology Center (Beattyville)
Students in Lee, Owsley, and Wolfe counties use this center.

Former schools:
Beattyville Elementary School (Beattyville) - Later moved outside the city limits
Southside Elementary School (Unincorporated area)

Demographics
 over 75% of the students are on free or reduced lunch.

References

External links
 
Education in Lee County, Kentucky
School districts in Kentucky